This is a list of the marine molluscs of the country of New Zealand, which are a part of the molluscan fauna of New Zealand, which is a part of the biodiversity of New Zealand.

Marine molluscs include marine gastropods (sea snails and sea slugs), bivalves (such as pipis, cockles, oysters, mussels, scallops), octopuses, squid and other classes of Mollusca. This list does not include the land and freshwater species.

Aplacophora
 Proneomenia quincarinata

Polyplacophora

Acanthochitonidae
 Acanthochitona thileniusi
 Acanthochitona zelandica
 Craspedochiton rubiginosus - Craspedochiton rubiginosus rubiginosus, Craspedochiton rubiginosus oliveri
 Cryptoconchus porosus
 Notoplax aupouria
 Notoplax cuneata
 Notoplax facilis
 Notoplax latalamina
 Notoplax mariae
 Notoplax violacea
 Notoplax websteri

Mopaliidae
 Aerilamma murdochi
 Diaphoroplax biramosus
 Frembleya egregia
 Guildingia obtecta
 Maorichiton caelatus
 Maorichiton schauinslandi
 Plaxiphora australis

Callochitonidae
 Callochiton crocinus
 Callochiton empleurus
 Callochiton kapitiensis
 Callochiton mortenseni

Chitonidae
 Chiton glaucus
 Onithochiton marmoratus
 Onithochiton neglectus - Onithochiton neglectus neglectus, Onithochiton neglectus opiniosus, Onithochiton neglectus subantarcticus
 Rhyssoplax aerea - Rhyssoplax aerea aerea, Rhyssoplax aerea huttoni
 Rhyssoplax canaliculata
 Rhyssoplax chathamensis
 Rhyssoplax clavata
 Rhyssoplax stangeri
 Rhyssoplax suteri
 Sypharochiton pelliserpentis
 Sypharochiton sinclairi
 Sypharochiton torri

Callochitonidae
 Eudoxochiton nobilis

Ischnochitonidae
 Ischnochiton circumvallatus
 Ischnochiton granulifer
 Ischnochiton luteoroseus
 Ischnochiton maorianus

Leptochitonidae
 Lepidopleurus finlayi
 Lepidopleurus inquinatus
 Lepidopleurus otagoensis

Loricidae
 Lorica haurakiensis

Gastropoda 
Nacellidae
 Cellana radians – golden limpet

Fissurellidae (keyhole limpets and slit limpets)
 Cornisepta festiva
 Monodilepas diemenensis
 Monodilepas otagoensis
 Scutus breviculus Blainville, 1817

Haliotidae
 Haliotis iris – paua

Calliostomatidae
 Calliostoma selectum – select maurea
 Selastele onustum

Trochidae (top snails)
 Diloma subrostrata – mudflat top shell
 Fossarina rimata
 Herpetopoma alacerrimum
 Herpetopoma bellum
 Herpetopoma benthicola
 Herpetopoma larochei
 Herpetopoma mariae
 Homalopoma crassicostata
 Homalopoma fluctuata
 Homalopoma imperforata
 Homalopoma micans
 Homalopoma nana
 Homalopoma rotella
 Homalopoma umbilicata
 Homalopoma variecostata

Turbinidae
 Astraea heliotropium – circular saw shell
 Cookia sulcata – Cook's turban
 Lunella smaragda – cat's eye

Neritidae
 Nerita melanotragus – black nerite

Batillariidae
 Zeacumantus lutulentus – koeti (a horn shell)

Turritellidae
 Maoricolpus roseus

Littorinidae (periwinkles)
 Austrolittorina antipodum – banded periwinkle

Rissoidae
 Alvania gallinacea
 Alvania gradatoides

Struthiolariidae
 Struthiolaria papulosa – ostrich foot

Ranellidae
 Charonia tritonis – giant triton
 Fusitriton retiolus
 Monoplex parthenopeus – giant triton
 Ranella olearium (Linnaeus, 1758) – wandering triton

Hipponicidae (hoof snails)
 Hipponix conicus wyattae

Buccinidae (whelks)
 Cominella glandiformis – mud whelk

Muricidae
 Poirieria zelandica – spiny murex

Volutidae
 Alcithoe arabica – Arabic volute
 Iredalina mirabilis – golden volute

Olividae
 Amalda australis – southern olive

Epitoniidae (wentletraps)
 Funiscala maxwelli
 Murdochella alacer

Janthinidae
 Janthina janthina – violet snail

Okadaiidae
 Vayssierea cinnabarea

Facelinidae
 Babakina caprinsulensis

Bullidae
 Bulla quoyii – brown bubble snail

Siphonariidae
 Benhamina obliquata

Amphibolidae
 Amphibola crenata – mud-flat snail

Onchidiidae
 Onchidella nigricans

Bivalvia
Mesodesmatidae
 Paphies australis – pipi
 Paphies subtriangulata – tuatua
 Paphies ventricosa – toheroa

Tellinidae
 Macomona liliana – large wedge shell

Veneridae
 Austrovenus stutchburyi – New Zealand cockle
 Dosinia anus – ringed dosinia

Ostreidae
 Saccostrea cucullata – rock oyster
 Tiostrea chilensis – Bluff oyster

Pectinidae
 Pecten novaezelandiae – New Zealand scallop
 Talochlamys zelandiae – New Zealand fan shell

Mytilidae
 Gigantidas gladius
 Mytilus edulis – blue mussel
 Perna canaliculus – New Zealand green-lipped mussel

Pinnidae
 Atrina zelandica – horse mussel

Scaphopoda 
Gadilidae
 Cadulus colubridens
 Cadulus delicatulus
 Cadulus teliger

Dentaliidae
 Dentalium diarrhox
 Dentalium ecostatum
 Dentalium glaucarena
 Dentalium nanum
 Dentalium suteri
 Dentalium tiwhana
 Dentalium zelandicum

Cephalopoda 
Spirulidae
 Spirula spirula – ram's horn squid

Sepiadariidae
 Sepioloidea pacifica – Pacific bobtail squid

Sepiolidae
 Iridoteuthis maoria

Cranchiidae
 Mesonychoteuthis hamiltoni – colossal squid

Histioteuthidae
 Histioteuthis reversa – reverse jewel squid

Octopodidae
 Pinnoctopus cordiformis – common New Zealand octopus

Argonautidae
 Argonauta nodosa – knobby argonaut

See also
 List of non-marine molluscs of New Zealand
 List of marine molluscs of Australia

References

Further reading
 Frederick Hutton. 1873. Catalogue of the marine Mollusca of New Zealand, with diagnoses of the species.
 Frederick Wollaston Hutton 1880. Manual of the New Zealand Mollusca. A systematic and descriptive catalogue of the marine and land shells, and of the soft mollusks and Polyzoa of New Zealand and the adjacent islands.
 Henry Suter. 1913. Manual of the New Zealand Mollusca Wellington.
 Powell A. W. B. 1979. New Zealand Mollusca, William Collins Publishers Ltd, Auckland, New Zealand, .

External links
  Molluscs.otago: index

Marine
Molluscs
New Zealand
New Zealand